Dicky was a 226-gross ton steamer, built by Gebruder Howdalt, Kiel in 1883.

Fate
On 4 February 1893, while steaming in bad weather off the coast of Queensland, Australia, Dicky was blown ashore at Caloundra, on a stretch of coast now known as Dicky Beach.

Partial wreck removal
The Sunshine Coast Council began removing the visible parts of the wreck on 30 July 2015.

Citations

1883 ships
Ships built in Kiel
Maritime incidents in 1893
Shipwrecks of Queensland